This is a list of tennis players who have represented the Montenegro Davis Cup team in an official Davis Cup match. Montenegro have taken part in the competition since 2007.

Players
This table is current through the end of the 2019 Davis Cup Euro/Africa Zone Group III matches (September 14, 2019).

References

Lists of Davis Cup tennis players
Davis Cup
Davis Cup